The following is a glossary of Skat terms used in playing the card game of Skat. Although Skat has German origins, it has now become an international game, often played to official rules. This glossary  includes terms which are common or regional, official or unofficial, as well as those used for special situations, starting hands, card combinations and terms relating to players. Many of the terms are also used in other trick-taking or Ace-Ten games or even in card games in general.

Commonly used terms

Playing positions 

The following terms are recognised by the International Laws of Skat or Skatordnung:

 Dealer: the person who shuffles and deals the cards
 Forehand: the person on the left of the dealer in Skat and who is first to be dealt cards.
 Middlehand: the person left of forehand and right of rearhand and who is the second player to be dealt cards.
 Rearhand or endhand: the person who is last to receive his cards. In a three-hand game this is also the dealer. In a four-hander, it is the person on the right of the dealer

The following terms are also commonly used in connection with the bidding phase:
 Hörer (Hearer): Forehand. The hearer hears the bid of the speaker or 2nd speaker.
 Sager (1st bidder): middlehand; the bidder makes the first bid to the hearer.
 Weitersager (2nd bidder): rearhand; the 2nd bidder bids to the hearer if the 1st bidder has dropped out, or to the 1st bidder if the hearer has dropped out.
 Soloist or declarer: the player who wins the auction and plays alone against the two defenders
 Defender or opponent: one of the two adversaries of the soloist.

Contracts

Official contracts 
Contracts permitted by the Skatordnung are:
 Suit: contract in which the soloist attempts to score at least 61 points. Trumps are the four Jacks or Unters and a suit announced by the soloist
 Grand: only the Jacks or Unters are trumps
 Null: contract in which there are no trumps and the soloist tries to avoid winning any tricks

Unofficial contracts 
The following contracts are also played, but are not recognised by the Skatordnung:
 Revolution: unofficial contract which is like Null, except that the opponents may exchange with the skat
 Bock: unofficial contract in which all game values count double
 Ramsch: unofficial contract where each player plays for himself and the aim is to score the fewest points
 Schieberamsch: like Ramsch, but the skat may be picked up by each player in clockwise order. If a player chooses to pass on the skat, the losers usually score twice as many minus points. After picking up the skat the player returns two cards to the skat, which may be picked up by the next player in turn. The skat is usually 'shoved' once per player, each player may also exchange one or two cards. The shoving of Jacks/Unters after picking up the skat is often forbidden.

Game value

Multipliers 
The multipliers used to raise the game value (see Skat) are:
 Hand: the skat is not picked up
 Schneider: the soloist or defenders score fewer than 31 points
 Schwarz: the soloist or defenders fail to win any tricks
 Schneider predicted (angesagt): the soloist predicts that his opponents will fail to reach 31 points
 Schwarz predicted: the soloist predicts that he will win every trick
 Ouvert: the soloist lays all his cards on the table before starting (no multiplier changes in Null games)

Stakes 
The game value is doubled with each of the following announcements in succession (cumulative multipliers in brackets):
 Kontra: said if a defender does not think the soloist will win (x2)
 Re: reply by the soloist to "Kontra", if he still thinks he will win (x4)
 Bock: response to "Re" by the defender if he is not convinced that the soloist can win, sometimes also called "Supra" (x8)
 Zippe: soloist's response to "Bock" or "Supra" if, despite the opinion of the defender, he is confident of winning; also called "Hirsch" (x16)

Cards or card combinations 
There is a variety of colourful names and nicknames in German for the various cards and card combinations in Skat:
 Der Alte ("the Old Man"): Jack of Clubs / Unter of Acorns
 Bauer ("farmer"): Jack or Unter
 Bilderbuch ("picture-book"): a starting hand comprising just court cards (Kings, Queens and Jacks or Kings, Obers and Unters). A successful solo game is impossible with such a hand.
 blank (1): a singleton, i.e. a single card of one suit in one's hand.
 blank (2): to be void i.e. have no cards of a particular suit in one's hand.
 Fahne ("flag"), Flöte ("flute"), Fackel ("torch") or Latte ("bar" or "batten"): a starting hand with a lot of cards from the same suit, typically 5, 6 or 7.
 Gauß: Jack of Clubs / Unter of Acorns
 Junge ("boy"): Jack or Unter
 Kaffeekränzchen ("coffee party"): a hand with all four Queens or Obers, which are usually of little use in the game
 Leere, Nullen or Luschen: blanks or nixers i.e. the Sevens, Eights and Nines.
 Oma ("Grandma"), Omablatt ("Grandma Hand") or Kutscher ("Coachman"): such a good hand that a soloist can not normally lose and, often, wins it schneider or schwarz.
 Raupenfraß ("caterpillar food"): a very poor hand of cards
 Rollmops ("pickled herring"), Wollkopf ("white head"), Bunter Hund ("coloured dog" i.e. "standing out like a sore thumb") or aus jedem Dorf ein Köter ("a dog/mongrel from every village"): a starting hand of 2 Jacks or Unters and 2 cards of each suit.
  Schneiden ("cut"), schnippeln ("snip") or einen Schnitt machen ("make a cut"), formerly schinden ("flay"): to withhold a high card and thereby capture a higher card from one's opponent. Usually an Ace is held back to capture a Ten. It runs the risk of losing one's own high card.
 Volle(s) ("full one"): Ace and Ten.
 Wenzel: Jack(s)r or Unter(s)

Regional terms 

 Schuss: Swabian for "re" (i.e. "double")
 Stoß: "re"
 platt: as in "die Karte hatte ich platt, die musste ich spielen" or "Ich hatte nur eine platte 10": a singleton
 Wenzel Lusche: Saxon nickname for Unter of Bells
 Daus: deuce i.e. ace

Skat sayings

See also 
 Glossary of card game terms

References

External links 
 skatinsel.academy/skat-lernen/glossar – Skat glossary and Skat School
 online-skat-lernen.de – History, rules, terminology for beginners and professionals
 skatsprueche.de – Skat language, Skat tips
 Terminology of the game of Skat (Skat terms  alphabetically sorted)

!
Skat
Wikipedia glossaries using unordered lists
Wikipedia glossaries using tables